Buddhism was the predominant religion in the Maldives until at least the 12th century CE. It is not clear how and when Buddhism was introduced into the islands.

Archaeology
Western interest in the archaeological remains of early cultures on the Maldives began with the work of H. C. P. Bell, a British commissioner of the Ceylon Civil Service. Bell was shipwrecked on the islands in 1879, and returned several times to investigate ancient Buddhist ruins. He studied the ancient mounds, called havitta or ustubu (these names are derived from chaitiya or stupa) by the Maldivians, which are found on many of the atolls.

Although Bell claimed that the ancient Maldivians followed Theravada Buddhism in the same manner as their Sinhalese ancestors from neighboring Sri Lanka, Maldivian Buddhist archaeological remains that were preserved in the Malé Museum display in fact Mahayana and Vajrayana iconography.

According to a legend of the Maldivian Folklore, a prince named Koimala from India or Sri Lanka entered the Maldives from the North (Ihavandhu) and became the first king from the House of Theemuge. Prior to that the Maldives had been settled by people of Dravidian origin from the nearest coasts, like the group today known as the Giravaaru who claim ancestry from ancient Tamils. It is unlikely that the Giraavaru islanders were the only early settlers in the Maldives. The importance they have been given is because they are mentioned in the legend about the establishment of the capital and kingly rule in Malé. The Giraavaru people were just one of the island communities predating Buddhism and the arrival of a Northern Kingly dynasty and the establishment of centralized political and administrative institutions.

The ancient Maldivian Kings promoted Buddhism and the first Maldive writings and artistic achievements in the form of highly developed sculpture and architecture are from that period. The conversion to Islam is mentioned in the ancient edicts written in copper plates from the end of the 12th century AD. There is also a locally well-known legend about a foreign saint (Persian or Moroccan according to differing versions) who subdued a demon known as Rannamaari.

Over the centuries, the islands have been visited and their development influenced by sailors and traders from countries on the Arabian Sea and the Bay of Bengal. Until relatively recent times, Mappila pirates from the Malabar Coast harassed the islands.

2012 vandalism of Buddhist sculptures
In February 2012, a group of Islamic extremists forced their way into the National Museum in Malé and attacked the museum's collection of pre-Islamic sculptures, destroying or severely damaging nearly the entire collection of about thirty Buddhist sculptures dating from the 6th to 12th centuries.  Museum staff indicated that as the sculptures were made from very brittle coral or limestone it would be impossible to repair most of them, and only two or three pieces were in a repairable condition.

See also

 Freedom of religion in the Maldives
 History of the Maldives
 Hinduism in the Maldives
 Islam in the Maldives
 Fua Mulaku Havitta
 Kuruhinna Tharaagandu

References

External links
Windows on Asia - Religion in Maldives
Conversion of the Maldives to Islam

 
Mal
Sinhalese people